The Union of Painters, Decorators, Whitewashers, Plasterers, and House Painters of Germany was a trade union representing painters in Germany.

The union was founded in 1885, bringing together various local unions.  It grew slowly, reaching 22,651 members in 1904, and 42,000 in 1916.  In 1919, it was a founding member of the General German Trade Union Confederation.  By 1928, it had 58,775 members.  In 1933, it was banned by the Nazi government.

Presidents
1890s: Albert Tobler
1914: Otto Streine
1928: Hans Batz

References

Painters' and decorators' trade unions
Trade unions in Germany
Trade unions established in 1885
Trade unions disestablished in 1933